Three Little Wishes (Chinese: 三个小愿望) is a Singaporean family mystery drama produced by production company Wawa Pictures and telecast on MediaCorp Channel 8.

Cast

Cameo Appearances

Trivia
 The Series was repeated every Tuesday at 2.00pm and currently every Saturday at 10.00am.
 Lyn Oh comeback drama after gaining 2 Young Talent Award. 
 Tan Jun Sheng comeback drama after  Three Wishes

See also
List of programmes broadcast by Mediacorp Channel 8

References 

Singaporean television series